SMS Strassburg was a light cruiser of the  in the German Kaiserliche Marine (Imperial Navy). Strassburg was built at the Kaiserliche Werft shipyard in Wilhelmshaven from 1910 to October 1912, when she was commissioned into the High Seas Fleet.

Strassburg spent the first year of her service overseas, after which she was assigned to the reconnaissance forces of the High Seas Fleet. She saw significant action at the Battle of Heligoland Bight in August 1914 and participated in the raid on Scarborough, Hartlepool and Whitby in December 1914. By 1916, the ship was transferred to the Baltic to operate against the Russian Navy. She saw action during Operation Albion in the Gulf of Riga in October 1917, including screening for the battleships  and  during the Battle of Moon Sound. She returned to the North Sea for the planned final operation against the British Grand Fleet in the last weeks of the war, and was involved in the mutinies that forced the cancellation of the operation.

The ship served briefly in the new Reichsmarine in 1919 before being transferred to Italy as a war prize. She was formally transferred in July 1920 and renamed Taranto for service in the Italian Navy. In 1936–1937, she was rebuilt for colonial duties and additional anti-aircraft guns were installed. She saw no significant action during World War II until the Italian surrender, which ended Italy's participation in the war. She was scuttled by the Italian Navy, captured and raised by the Germans, and sunk by Allied bombers in October 1943. The Germans raised the ship again, which was sunk a second time by bombers in September 1944. Taranto was finally broken up for scrap in 1946–1947.

Design

Her propulsion system consisted of two sets of Marine-type steam turbines driving two screw propellers. They were designed to give , but reached  in service. These were powered by sixteen coal-fired Marine-type water-tube boilers, although they were later altered to use fuel oil that was sprayed on the coal to increase its burn rate. Strassburg had a crew of 18 officers and 336 enlisted men.

The ship was armed with a main battery of twelve  SK L/45 guns in single pedestal mounts. Two were placed side by side forward on the forecastle, eight were located amidships, four on either side, and two were side by side aft. They were supplied with 1,800 rounds of ammunition, for 150 shells per gun. She was also equipped with a pair of  torpedo tubes with five torpedoes; the tubes were submerged in the hull on the broadside. She could also carry 120 mines. In 1915, Strassburg was completely rearmed, replacing the 10.5 cm guns with seven  SK L/45 guns, two  SK L/45 guns, and two deck-mounted 50 cm torpedo tubes.

Service history
Strassburg was ordered under the contract name Ersatz  and was laid down at the Kaiserliche Werft shipyard in Wilhelmshaven in 1910 and launched on 24 August 1911, after which fitting-out work commenced. She was commissioned into the High Seas Fleet on 9 October 1912.

Strassburg spent the first year of service overseas, from 1913 to 1914. The three ships were organized in a special "Detached Division". The trio departed Germany on 9 December 1913 and proceeded to the German colonies in western Africa. The ships visited Lomé in Togoland, Duala and Victoria in Kamerun, and Swakopmund in German South-West Africa. From Africa, the ships sailed to St. Helena and then on to Rio de Janeiro, arriving on 15 February 1914. Strassburg was detached to visit Buenos Aires, Argentina before returning to meet the two battleships in Montevideo, Uruguay. The three ships sailed south around Cape Horn and then north to Valparaiso, Chile, arriving on 2 April and remaining for over a week.

On 11 April, the ships departed Valparaiso for the long journey back to Germany. On the return trip, the ships visited several more ports, including Bahía Blanca, Argentina, before returning to Rio de Janeiro. On 16 May the ships left Rio de Janeiro for the Atlantic leg of the journey; they stopped in Cape Verde, Madeira, and Vigo, Spain while en route to Germany. Strassburg, Kaiser, and König Albert arrived in Kiel on 17 June 1914. A week later, on 24 June, the Detached Division was dissolved. After returning to Germany, Strassburg spent majority of her career in the reconnaissance forces of the High Seas Fleet.

World War I
On 16 August, some two weeks after the outbreak of World War I, Strassburg and  conducted a sweep into the Hoofden to search for British reconnaissance forces. Significantly outnumbered, the two German cruisers broke contact and returned to port.

Strassburg was heavily engaged at the Battle of Heligoland Bight less than two weeks later, on 28 August. British battlecruisers and light cruisers raided the German reconnaissance screen commanded by Rear Admiral Leberecht Maass in the Heligoland Bight. Strassburg was the first German cruiser to leave port to reinforce the German reconnaissance forces. Strassburg attacked Arethusa, but was driven off by the 1st Destroyer Flotilla. Shortly thereafter, the British battlecruisers intervened and sank  and Maass's flagship Cöln. Strassburg and the rest of the surviving light cruisers retreated into the haze and were reinforced by the battlecruisers of the I Scouting Group.

Strassburg was present during the raid on Scarborough, Hartlepool and Whitby on 15–16 December, as part of the screening force for the battlecruisers of Rear Admiral Franz von Hipper's I Scouting Group. After completing the bombardment of the towns, the Germans began to withdraw, though British forces moved to intercept them. Strassburg, two of the other screening cruisers, and two flotillas of torpedo boats steamed between two British squadrons. The Germans were able to use the bad weather to cover their withdrawal. The ship had been transferred to the Baltic by 1916, and so missed the Battle of Jutland on 31 May 1916.

By 1917, she was assigned to the VI Scouting Group, which saw action during Operation Albion against the Russian naval forces in the Gulf of Riga. At 06:00 on 14 October 1917, Strassburg, and  left Libau to escort minesweeping operations in the Gulf of Riga. They were attacked by Russian  coastal guns on their approach and were temporarily forced to turn away. By 08:45, however, they had anchored off the Mikailovsk Bank and the minesweepers began to clear a path in the minefields. In the ensuing Battle of Moon Sound, the battleships destroyed the old pre-dreadnought  and forced the pre-dreadnought  to leave the Gulf. On 21 October, Strassburg and the battleship  were tasked with assaulting the island of Kyno. The two ships bombarded the island; Strassburg expended approximately 55 rounds on the port of Salismünde. On 31 October, Strassburg carried the first military governor of the captured islands from Libau to Arensburg.

By October 1918, Strassburg was assigned to the IV Scouting Group, which was to participate in a final, climactic attack by the High Seas Fleet. Admirals Reinhard Scheer and Hipper intended to inflict as much damage as possible on the British navy, in order to secure a better bargaining position for Germany, whatever the cost to the fleet. On the morning of 27 October, days before the operation was scheduled to begin, around 45 crew members from Strassburgs engine room slipped over the side of the ship and went into Wilhelmshaven. The crewmen had to be rounded up and returned to the ship, after which the IV Scouting Group moved to Cuxhaven. Here, men from all six cruisers in the unit refused to work in protest of the war, and in support of the armistice proposed by Prince Maximilian. On the morning of 29 October 1918, the order was given to sail from Wilhelmshaven the following day. The unrest ultimately forced Hipper and Scheer to cancel the operation. In early November, Strassburg and  steamed to Sassnitz. There, the commander of Strassburg took command of the naval forces in the port and invited a sailor's council to be formed to assist in controlling the forces there.

Italian service
After the war, Strassburg served briefly with the reorganized Reichsmarine in 1919. She was stricken from the naval register on 10 March 1920 and ceded to Italy as a war prize. She was transferred under the name "O" on 20 July 1920 in the French port of Cherbourg. Strassburg was commissioned into the Italian Regia Marina (Royal Navy) on 2 June 1925 and her name was changed to Taranto, initially classed as a scout. Her two 8.8 cm anti-aircraft guns were replaced with two Italian 3-inch /40 anti-aircraft guns. She also had her superfiring 15 cm gun moved amidships, but in 1926 it was moved back to clear room for a platform to hold a scout plane. She initially carried a Macchi M.7, which was later replaced by a CANT 25AR.

From May 1926, Taranto was deployed to the Red Sea to patrol Italian East Africa, where she served as the flagship of the colonial flotilla there. She remained there until January 1927. In 1931, her M.7 seaplane was replaced with the CANT 24AR seaplane. Another tour in East Africa followed from September 1935 to 1936. After returning to Italy, she underwent a refit that involved removing her forward two boilers and the funnel that vented them. Eight  /65 and ten  machine guns were added for close-range anti-aircraft defense.

In early July 1940, Taranto, the auxiliary cruiser , the minelayer , and the destroyers  and  laid a series of minefields in the Gulf of Taranto and in the southern Adriatic, totaling 2,335 mines. She was thereafter assigned to the Forza Navale Speciale (Special Naval Force) along with the other ex-German cruiser still in Italian service, Bari. The FNS was slated to take part in an amphibious invasion of the British island of Malta in 1942, but the operation was cancelled. The ship was transferred to Livorno on 26 February and reduced to a training ship. She was decommissioned in December in La Spezia and was scuttled there on 9 September 1943 a day after the armistice that ended the war for Italy was declared to prevent her from being seized by the Germans, who rapidly moved to occupy the country after Italy surrendered. The Germans captured the ship and re-floated her, though she was sunk by Allied bombers on 23 October. The Germans re-floated the ship again, and again she was sunk by bombers, on 23 September 1944 in the outer La Spezia roadstead, where the Germans had moved the hulk to block one of the entrances to the Gulf of La Spezia. Taranto was ultimately raised and broken up for scrap in 1946–1947.

Footnotes

References

Further reading

External links
 Taranto Marina Militare website

Magdeburg-class cruisers
Ships built in Wilhelmshaven
1911 ships
World War I cruisers of Germany
World War II shipwrecks in the Mediterranean Sea
Maritime incidents in September 1943
Maritime incidents in October 1943
Cruisers sunk by aircraft
Maritime incidents in September 1944
Scuttled vessels
Cruisers of the Regia Marina